Caleb Smith State Park Preserve is a state park located in Suffolk County, New York in the United States. The park is near the north shore of Long Island in the town of Smithtown. Prior to its current name, the park was called Nissequogue River State Park, a name now used for park lands on the former Kings Park Psychiatric Center grounds. Previously, it was simply known as the Wyandanch Preserve.

History
Originally part of the estate of Caleb Smith (1724–1800), the great grandson of Richard "Bull" Smith, the house was built in 1753 with his father Daniel Smith II. Although it has undergone many renovations, much of the original house still stands within the present building. The house was moved in either 1955 or 1958 to a plot of land behind the Smithtown Main Public Library in the Village of the Branch, New York.

Throughout the 19th century, the original house was expanded considerably. By 1888 it was bought by the Brooklyn Gun Club, and converted into a sportsman's hunting and fishing preserve. The property was named the "Wyandanch Club" in 1893. In 1963, it was acquired by the New York State Office of Parks, Recreation and Historic Preservation.

The Wyandanch Club Historic District was added to the National Register of Historic Places as a national historic district in 1990.

Park description
The  park is managed primarily as a nature preserve, and offers space for passive recreation such as hiking, fishing, and cross-country skiing. The park also offers recreation programs, a nature museum with wildlife displays, and a nature trail.

Two branches of the Nissequogue River pass through the park, which also includes the Wyandanch Club Historic District.

Panorama

See also
 List of New York state parks

References

External links

 New York State Parks: Caleb Smith State Park Preserve
 Friends of Caleb Smith Preserve

State parks of New York (state)
Historic districts on the National Register of Historic Places in New York (state)
Museums in Suffolk County, New York
Smithtown, New York
Natural history museums in New York (state)
Parks in Suffolk County, New York
Nature centers in New York (state)
National Register of Historic Places in Suffolk County, New York